The Caracu is a Brazilian breed of beef cattle. It is a Criollo breed, derived from European cattle brought to Brazil by the conquistadors; it has little or no zebuine influence. It was originally a triple-purpose breed, used for draught work and transport, for meat and for milk; in the twenty-first century it is reared principally for beef, but there are also dairy lines. It has contributed to the development of a number of other breeds, among them the Caldeano. It is closely similar to the Mocho Nacional, a polled breed, and it is probable that the two will be merged.

History 

The Caracu derives from cattle brought from Portugal to Brazil by the conquistadors from 1532 onwards. It is not known of what type these were, but they may have been similar to the modern Alentejana, Arouquesa, Barrosã, Minhota or Mirandesa breeds.

The Caracu originated in the southern part of Minas Gerais, and later spread into the state of São Paulo. An early description is that of Nicolas Athanassof in 1911.

In 1913 an influential book by Eduardo Cotrim on cattle-rearing in Brazil, with many colour illustrations, was published in Brussels. It was highly critical of both Brazilian methods and Brazilian cattle, and may have initiated a decline in numbers of the Caracu, which fell steeply during much of the twentieth century as a result of cross-breeding with zebuine or other taurine breeds, coming close to the point of extinction. 

In 1976 the Istituto de Zootecnia of Sertãozinho, in the state of São Paulo, added the Caracu to its research programme; in 1980 the breed association, which had been dormant since 1960, became active again. Numbers increased rapidly: from 12,000 in 1979, the population rose to about 31,000 head in 1994, and to over 85,000 in 2010. In 2020 the total number reported was just over 162,000.

References 

Beef cattle breeds
Cattle breeds originating in Brazil
Cattle breeds